Robyn Mokihana Ah Mow (born September 15, 1975) is the head coach of the Hawaii Rainbow Wahine volleyball team and a former American indoor volleyball player. She was a setter on the USA national team and played at the 2000 Sydney Olympics, the 2004 Athens Olympics, and at the 2008 Beijing Olympics, helping Team USA to a silver medal. She worked as an assistant coach at the University of Hawaii Rainbow Wahine volleyball team from 2011-2015 and was named Head Coach in 2017 after Dave Shoji's retirement. She has also served as a club coach at Na Keiki Mau Loa Volleyball Club.

Personal life
Ah Mow was born in Honolulu, Hawaii, to Talmage and Lovina Ah Mow (both deceased) and has two brothers, Kekoa and Tyson, and two sisters, Dara and Arlene. She attended McKinley High School in Honolulu, Hawaii, where she was a first-team all-Oahu Interscholastic Association East selection for four years and a three-time All-State first team selection.

Ah Mow was married to Niobel Rafael Santos, former amateur athlete who is now a member of the U.S. Armed Forces and has served three tours in Iraq. They have two sons, Jordan (born in 2003) and Jreyden (born in 2016), and daughter, Jream (born in 2010). They divorced in 2019.

College
Ah Mow attended college at the University of Hawai'i from 1993-1996 where she was a two-time AVCA First Team all-American. As a setter, she helped Hawai'i to the 1996 NCAA Championship match, losing to Stanford.

Professional and Olympic career
She joined the USA national team in 1999, setting in seven games at the NORCECA championships and playing in 13 sets at the World Cup. In 2000, she  played in four sets of the Nike Americas’ Volleyball Challenge, helping Team USA qualify for the 2000 Sydney Olympics. She set the team to victories over no. 4 China, no. 5 Korea and no. 7 Japan at the Grand Prix. At the 2000 Olympic Games, she started all seven matches and led the team to a .263 hitting percentage and a fourth-place finish.

In 2001, she earned Most Valuable Player honors at the World Championship Qualification Tournament and was also named the "Best Setter" at the NORCECA Zone Championships and played professionally for Castelo de Maia in Portugal.

At the 2004 Olympic Games in Athens, Greece, the team tied for fifth overall after losing to Brazil in the quarterfinals.

Robyn made her third Olympic appearance at the 2008 Summer Olympics, helping Team USA to a silver medal.

In her career, she has set for team USA at the World Grand Prix, the Pan American Cup, NORCECA, the Olympics, the FIVB World Championship and World Cup as well as numerous exhibition tours.

Head coaching record

{{CBB Yearly Record Entry
 | championship = 
 | season       = 2020–21
 | name         = Hawaii
 | overall      = <small> Cancelled due to the  COVID-19 pandemic </small>
 | conference   = 
 | confstanding = 
 | postseason   = 
}}

Individual awards
 2001 FIVB World Grand Prix "Best Setter" 2001 NORCECA Championship "Best Setter" 2003 NORCECA Championship "Best Setter" 2006 Pan-American Cup "Best Setter"''

References

1975 births
American expatriate sportspeople in Switzerland
American sportspeople of Samoan descent
American women's volleyball players
American volleyball coaches
Expatriate volleyball players in Switzerland
Hawaii people of Chinese descent
Hawaii Rainbow Wahine volleyball players
Hawaii Rainbow Wahine volleyball coaches
Living people
Medalists at the 2008 Summer Olympics
Olympic silver medalists for the United States in volleyball
Setters (volleyball)
Sportspeople from Honolulu
Volleyball players at the 2000 Summer Olympics
Volleyball players at the 2004 Summer Olympics
Volleyball players at the 2008 Summer Olympics
Volleyball players from Honolulu